The 2001–02 Detroit Red Wings season was the 76th National Hockey League season in Detroit, Michigan. The Wings scored 116 points, winning the Central Division, their third Presidents' Trophy, and home ice throughout the playoffs. The team is considered one of the greatest teams in NHL history with ten future Hockey Hall of Famers on the team, as well as a Hall of Fame coach in Scotty Bowman.

After Detroit's shocking upset loss in the first playoff round to the Los Angeles Kings, general manager Ken Holland went out into the trade market to address Detroit's more glaring needs. He quickly filled them by trading for future Hall of Fame goaltender Dominik Hasek and signing Brett Hull and Luc Robitaille. These big names joined other future Hall of Fame talents in Chris Chelios, Sergei Fedorov, Igor Larionov, Nicklas Lidstrom, Brendan Shanahan and Steve Yzerman, as well as important supporting players in Jiri Fischer, former All-Star Steve Duchesne, Tomas Holmstrom, the "Grind Line" of Kris Draper, Kirk Maltby, and Darren McCarty, and Pavel Datsyuk in his rookie season, and rounded out with legendary coach Scotty Bowman, who had decided to return for one more year.

The Wings were quickly selected as favorites to win the Stanley Cup by pundits and they went on to prove them right. With so much talent on one team — including the first time three 500-goal scorers were on the same team, as well as a fourth to become in Brendan Shanahan that will eventually hit the mark during the season — they quickly got off to a great start, winning 22 of their first 27 games. After finishing with 116 points and the best record in the NHL (by 15 points), the Wings had earned the first seed in the Western Conference and met the Vancouver Canucks in the first round. After the Canucks took the first two games, it looked like the Canucks were going to sweep the Red Wings and the Red Wings were going to have their second straight early exit. Captain Steve Yzerman gave a closed-door speech to the team. Only the players in the locker room knew what was said, but the Wings headed to Vancouver and won four straight games to win the series.

After a quick series against the division rival St. Louis Blues, Detroit met their old nemesis, the second-seeded Colorado Avalanche in the Conference Finals. They battled back and forth during the series, tying the series three times before reaching game seven in Detroit. The Wings came out firing and won the deciding game 7–0. After that, the Wings fought the cinderella story Carolina Hurricanes for the Stanley Cup, winning in game five at home. Over one million people showed up for the victory parade in downtown Detroit on June 17.

There was no All-Star game this year as the Winter Olympics in Salt Lake City took place in February 2002 where eleven Red Wings players represented their countries. Brendan Shanahan and Steve Yzerman represented Canada; Chris Chelios and Brett Hull represented the United States; Dominik Hasek represented the Czech Republic; Sergei Fedorov, Pavel Datsyuk and Igor Larionov represented Russia; and Nicklas Lidstrom, Fredrik Olausson and Tomas Holmstrom represented Sweden.

The Red Wings sold out all 41 home games in 2001–02 as 20,058 fans packed Joe Louis Arena for every regular season and playoff game played in Detroit. The season was chronicled by Detroit Free Press sportswriter Nicholas J. Cotsonika's 2002 book, Hockey Gods: The Inside Story of the Red Wings' Hall of Fame Team.

Regular season
The Red Wings tied the Los Angeles Kings for the most power-play goals scored during the regular season with 73.

Season standings

Playoffs
The Detroit Red Wings ended the 2001–02 regular season as the Western Conference's first seed and played Vancouver in the first round. After losing the first two games in Detroit, the Wings rallied back to win four straight. Then the Wings made quick work of the Blues before meeting the second-seeded Colorado Avalanche in the Western Conference Finals. The Wings would beat the Avalanche in a hard-fought seven game series, winning the final game 7–0. As the final game in the series came to a close, the Neil Diamond song "Sweet Caroline" was played over the Joe Louis Arena loudspeakers, as the victorious Red Wings prepared to head off to a Stanley Cup clinching series with the third-seeded victors of the Eastern Conference, the Carolina Hurricanes. They won the series in five games, defeating the Hurricanes three to one at home in Detroit on June 13 to take home their tenth Stanley Cup.

Schedule and results

Regular season

|- align="center" bgcolor="#bbffbb" 
| 1 || October 4 || Detroit || 4 – 3 || San Jose || OT || Hasek || 17,496 || 1–0–0–0 || 2 || 
|- align="center" bgcolor="#bbffbb" 
| 2 || October 6 || Detroit || 4 – 1 || Vancouver || || Hasek || 18,422 || 2–0–0–0 || 4 || 
|- align="center" bgcolor="#ffbbbb" 
| 3 || October 10 || Calgary || 4 – 2 || Detroit || || Hasek || 20,058 || 2–1–0–0 || 4 || 
|- align="center" bgcolor="#bbffbb" 
| 4 || October 12 || Buffalo || 2 – 4 || Detroit || || Hasek || 20,058 || 3–1–0–0 || 6 || 
|- align="center" bgcolor="#bbffbb"  
| 5 || October 13 || Detroit || 5 – 4 || NY Islanders || OT || Legace || 16,234 || 4–1–0–0 || 8 || 
|- align="center" bgcolor="#bbffbb" 
| 6 || October 16 || Columbus || 3 – 4 || Detroit || || Hasek || 20,058 || 5–1–0–0 || 10 || 
|- align="center" bgcolor="#bbffbb" 
| 7 || October 18 || Philadelphia || 2 – 3 || Detroit || || Hasek || 20,058 || 6–1–0–0 || 12 || 
|- align="center" bgcolor="#bbffbb"  
| 8 || October 20 || Los Angeles || 2 – 3 || Detroit || || Hasek || 20,058 || 7–1–0–0 || 14 || 
|- align="center" bgcolor="#bbffbb"  
| 9 || October 24 || Edmonton || 1 – 4 || Detroit || || Hasek || 20,058 || 8–1–0–0 || 16 || 
|- align="center" bgcolor="#ffbbbb"  
| 10 || October 26 || Dallas || 3 – 2 || Detroit || || Hasek || 20,058 || 8–2–0–0 || 16 || 
|- align="center" bgcolor="#bbffbb"  
| 11 || October 27 || Detroit || 1 – 0 || Nashville || || Legace || 17,113 || 9–2–0–0 || 18 || 
|- align="center" bgcolor="#bbffbb"  
| 12 || October 30 || Detroit || 5 – 2 || Carolina || || Legace || 18,730 || 10–2–0–0 || 20 || 
|- align="center" bgcolor="#bbffbb"  
| 13 || October 31 || Detroit || 4 – 3 || Dallas || OT || Legace || 18,532 || 11–2–0–0 || 22 || 
|-

|- align="center" bgcolor="#bbffbb" 
| 14 || November 2 || NY Islanders || 1 – 2 || Detroit || || Hasek || 20,058 || 12–2–0–0 || 24 || 
|- align="center" bgcolor="#ffbbbb" 
| 15 || November 4 || Detroit || 4 – 5 || Chicago || || Hasek || 20,989 || 12–3–0–0 || 24 || 
|- align="center" bgcolor="#bbffbb" 
| 16 || November 7 || Detroit || 3 – 1 || Phoenix || || Hasek || 15,023 || 13–3–0–0 || 26 || 
|- align="center" bgcolor="#bbffbb"
| 17 || November 9 || Detroit || 1 – 0 || Anaheim || || Hasek || 17,174 || 14–3–0–0 || 28 || 
|- align="center"
| 18 || November 10 || Detroit || 2 – 3 || Los Angeles || OT || Hasek || 18,385 || 14–3–0–1 || 29 || 
|- align="center" bgcolor="#bbffbb" 
| 19 || November 13 || Carolina || 3 – 4 || Detroit || || Hasek || 20,058 || 15–3–0–1 || 31 || 
|- align="center" bgcolor="#bbffbb" 
| 20 || November 16 || Minnesota || 3 – 8 || Detroit || || Legace || 20,058 || 16–3–0–1 || 33 || 
|- align="center" bgcolor="#bbffbb"
| 21 || November 17 || Los Angeles || 2 – 4 || Detroit || || Hasek || 20,058 || 17–3–0–1 || 35 || 
|- align="center" bgcolor="#bbffbb"
| 22 || November 20 || Nashville || 3 – 6 || Detroit || || Hasek || 20,058 || 18–3–0–1 || 37 || 
|- align="center" bgcolor="#bbffbb"
| 23 || November 21 || Detroit || 1 – 0 || Columbus || OT || Legace || 18,136 || 19–3–0–1 || 39 || 
|- align="center" bgcolor="#bbffbb" 
| 24 || November 23 || St. Louis || 1 – 3 || Detroit || || Hasek || 20,058 || 20–3–0–1 || 41 || 
|- align="center" bgcolor="#ffffbb" 
| 25 || November 25 || Chicago || 4 – 4 || Detroit || OT || Hasek || 20,058 || 20–3–1–1 || 42 || 
|- align="center" bgcolor="#bbffbb" 
| 26 || November 27 || Calgary || 2 – 4 || Detroit || || Hasek || 20,058 || 21–3–1–1 || 44 || 
|- align="center" bgcolor="#bbffbb" 
| 27 || November 30 || New Jersey || 2 – 4 || Detroit || || Legace || 20,058 || 22–3–1–1 || 46 || 
|-

|- align="center" bgcolor="#ffbbbb" 
| 28 || December 1 || Detroit || 1 – 4 || New Jersey || || Hasek || 18,559 || 22–4–1–1 || 46 || 
|- align="center" bgcolor="#ffbbbb" 
| 29 || December 5 || Colorado || 4 – 1 || Detroit || || Hasek || 20,058 || 22–5–1–1 || 46 || 
|- align="center" bgcolor="#ffffbb" 
| 30 || December 7 || Detroit || 1 – 1 || Phoenix || OT || Hasek || 20,058 || 22–5–2–1 || 47 || 
|- align="center" bgcolor="#ffbbbb" 
| 31 || December 10 || Detroit || 0 – 2 || Calgary || || Hasek || 16,009 || 22–6–2–1 || 47 || 
|- align="center" bgcolor="#bbffbb" 
| 32 || December 13 || Detroit || 2 – 1 || Edmonton || || Hasek || 16,839 || 23–6–2–1 || 49 || 
|- align="center" bgcolor="#ffbbbb"
| 33 || December 15 || Detroit || 0 – 3 || Vancouver || || Hasek || 18,422 || 23–7–2–1 || 49 || 
|- align="center" bgcolor="#ffbbbb"
| 34 || December 17 || Chicago || 2 – 0 || Detroit || || Legace || 20,058 || 23–8–2–1 || 49 || 
|- align="center" bgcolor="#bbffbb" 
| 35 || December 19 || Vancouver || 1 – 4 || Detroit || || Hasek || 20,058 || 24–8–2–1 || 51 || 
|- align="center" bgcolor="#bbffbb" 
| 36 || December 21 || San Jose || 0 – 3 || Detroit || || Hasek || 20,058 || 25–8–2–1 || 53 || 
|- align="center" bgcolor="#bbffbb" 
| 37 || December 23 || Detroit || 5 – 0 || Chicago || || Hasek || 22,158 || 26–8–2–1 || 55 || 
|- align="center" bgcolor="#ffffbb" 
| 38 || December 26 || Detroit || 3 – 3 || Minnesota || OT || Hasek || 18,568 || 26–8–3–1 || 56 || 
|- align="center" bgcolor="#bbffbb"
| 39 || December 27 || Columbus || 1 – 5 || Detroit || || Legace || 20,058 || 27–8–3–1 || 58 || 
|- align="center"
| 40 || December 29 || Detroit || 2 – 3 || Nashville || OT || Hasek || 17,244 || 27–8–3–2 || 59 || 
|- align="center" bgcolor="#bbffbb"
| 41 || December 31 || Minnesota || 2 – 4 || Detroit || || Hasek || 20,058 || 28–8–3–2 || 61 || 
|-

|- align="center" bgcolor="#bbffbb" 
| 42 || January 2 || Anaheim || 3 – 5 || Detroit || || Hasek || 20,058 || 29–8–3–2 || 63 || 
|- align="center" bgcolor="#bbffbb" 
| 43 || January 5 || Colorado || 1 – 3 || Detroit || || Hasek || 20,058 || 30–8–3–2 || 65 || 
|- align="center" bgcolor="#bbffbb"
| 44 || January 9 || Vancouver || 4 – 5 || Detroit || OT || Hasek  || 20,058 || 31–8–3–2 || 67 || 
|- align="center" bgcolor="#bbffbb"  
| 45 || January 12 || Dallas || 2 – 5 || Detroit || || Hasek ||20,058 || 32–8–3–2 || 69 || 
|- align="center" bgcolor="#ffffbb"
| 46 || January 15 || Detroit || 2 – 2 || Phoenix || OT || Legace || 15,186 || 32–8–4–2 || 70 || 
|- align="center" bgcolor="#ffbbbb" 
| 47 || January 16 || Detroit || 2 – 3 || Dallas || || Hasek || 18,532 || 32–9–4–2 || 70 || 
|- align="center" bgcolor="#bbffbb" 
| 48 || January 18 || Washington || 1 – 3 || Detroit || || Hasek || 20,058 || 33–9–4–2 || 72 || 
|- align="center" bgcolor="#bbffbb" 
| 49 || January 20 || Ottawa || 2 – 3 || Detroit || OT || Hasek || 20,058 || 34–9–4–2 || 74 || 
|- align="center" bgcolor="#ffffbb" 
| 50 || January 23 || San Jose || 2 – 2 || Detroit || OT || Hasek || 20,058 || 34–9–5–2 || 75 || 
|- align="center" bgcolor="#bbffbb" 
| 51 || January 25 || Phoenix || 1 – 4 || Detroit || || Legace || 20,058 || 35–9–5–2 || 77 || 
|- align="center" bgcolor="#bbffbb" 
| 52 || January 26 || Detroit || 5 – 2 || St. Louis || || Hasek || 20,017 || 36–9–5–2 || 79 || 
|- align="center" bgcolor="#ffffbb"
| 53 || January 28 || Detroit || 1 – 1 || Edmonton || OT || Hasek || 16,839 || 36–9–6–2 || 80 || 
|- align="center" bgcolor="#ffbbbb"
| 54 || January 30 || Detroit || 3 – 4 || Calgary || || Legace || 17,239 || 36–10–6–2 || 80 || 
|-

|- align="center" bgcolor="#bbffbb" 
| 55 || February 4 || Detroit || 3 – 1 || Colorado || || Hasek || 18,007 || 37–10–6–2 || 82 || 
|- align="center" bgcolor="#bbffbb" 
| 56 || February 6 || NY Rangers || 1 – 3 || Detroit || || Hasek || 20,058 || 38–10–6–2 || 84 || 
|- align="center" bgcolor="#ffbbbb" 
| 57 || February 8 || Columbus || 3 – 2 || Detroit || || Legace || 20,058 || 38–11–6–2 || 84 || 
|- align="center" bgcolor="#bbffbb"  
| 58 || February 9 || Detroit || 3 – 2 || Ottawa || || Hasek || 18,500 || 39–11–6–2 || 86 || 
|- align="center" bgcolor="#bbffbb" 
| 59 || February 11 || Detroit || 3 – 2 || Montreal || || Hasek || 21,273 || 40–11–6–2 || 88 || 
|- align="center" bgcolor="#bbffbb"  
| 60 || February 13 || Detroit || 2 – 0 || Minnesota || || Hasek || 18,568 || 41–11–6–2 || 90 || 
|- align="center" bgcolor="#bbffbb"  
| 61 || February 26 || Detroit || 4 – 3 || Tampa Bay || OT || Hasek || 20,914 || 42–11–6–2 || 92 || 
|- align="center" bgcolor="#bbffbb" 
| 62 || February 27 || Detroit || 3 – 2 || Florida || OT || Hasek || 19,250 || 43–11–6–2 || 94 || 
|-

|- align="center" bgcolor="#bbffbb"
| 63 || March 2 || Detroit || 4 – 2 || Pittsburgh || || Hasek || 17,148 || 44–11–6–2 || 96 || 
|- align="center" bgcolor="#bbffbb" 
| 64 || March 6 || Toronto || 2 – 6 || Detroit || || Hasek || 20,058 || 45–11–6–2 || 98 || 
|- align="center" bgcolor="#bbffbb"
| 65 || March 9 || Detroit || 5 – 2 || St. Louis || || Hasek || 19,921 || 46–11–6–2 || 100 || 
|- align="center" bgcolor="#ffbbbb"
| 66 || March 10 || Detroit || 1 – 5 || Buffalo || || Hasek || 18,690 || 46–12–6–2 || 100 || 
|- align="center" bgcolor="#bbffbb"
| 67 || March 13 || Edmonton || 3 – 4 || Detroit || OT || Hasek || 20,058 || 47–12–6–2 || 102 || 
|- align="center" bgcolor="#ffbbbb"
| 68 || March 16 || Detroit || 1 – 2 || Boston || || Legace || 17,565 || 47–13–6–2 || 102 || 
|- align="center" bgcolor="#bbffbb"
| 69 || March 17 || Detroit || 5 – 3 || NY Rangers || || Hasek || 18,200 || 48–13–6–2 || 104 || 
|- align="center" bgcolor="#ffbbbb"
| 70 || March 19 || Anaheim || 2 – 1 || Detroit || || Hasek || 20,058 || 48–14–6–2 || 104 || 
|- align="center" bgcolor="#bbffbb"
| 71 || March 21 || Detroit || 3 – 2 || Columbus || OT || Hasek || 18,136 || 49–14–6–2 || 106 || 
|- align="center" bgcolor="#bbffbb"
| 72 || March 23 || Detroit || 2 – 0 || Colorado || || Hasek || 18,007 || 50–14–6–2 || 108 || 
|- align="center" bgcolor="#ffffbb"
| 73 || March 25 || Detroit || 3 – 3 || Nashville || OT || Legace || 16,518 || 50–14–7–2 || 109 || 
|- align="center" bgcolor="#ffffbb"
| 74 || March 28 || Nashville || 3 – 3 || Detroit || OT || Hasek || 20,058 || 50–14–8–2 || 110 || 
|- align="center" bgcolor="#bbffbb"
| 75 || March 30 || Atlanta || 1 – 4 || Detroit || || Legace || 20,058 || 51–14–8–2 || 112 || 
|-

|- align="center"
| 76 || April 1 || Toronto || 5 – 4 || Detroit || OT || Legace || 20,058 || 51–14–8–3 || 113 || 
|- align="center" bgcolor="#ffffbb"
| 77 || April 3 || Detroit || 1 – 1 || Anaheim || OT || Hasek || 17,174 || 51–14–9–3 || 114 || 
|- align="center" bgcolor="#ffbbbb"
| 78 || April 4 || Detroit || 0 – 3 || Los Angeles || || Hasek || 18,621 || 51–15–9–3 || 114 || 
|- align="center" bgcolor="#ffbbbb"
| 79 || April 6 || Detroit || 3 – 6 || San Jose || || Legace || 17,496 || 51–16–9–3 || 114 || 
|- align="center" bgcolor="#ffffbb"
| 80 || April 10 || Chicago || 3 – 3 || Detroit || OT || Hasek || 20,058 || 51–16–10–3 || 115 || 
|- align="center"
| 81 || April 13 || Detroit || 2 – 3 || St. Louis || OT || Hasek || 19,877 || 51–16–10–4 || 116 || 
|- align="center" bgcolor="#ffbbbb"
| 82 || April 14 || St. Louis || 5 – 3 || Detroit || || Hasek || 20,058 || 51–17–10–4 || 116 || 
|-

|-
| Legend:

Playoffs

|- align="center"  bgcolor="#ffbbbb" 
| 1 || April 17 || Vancouver || 4 – 3 || Detroit || OT || Hasek || 20,058 || Canucks lead 1–0 || 
|- align="center"  bgcolor="#ffbbbb"
| 2 || April 19 || Vancouver || 5 – 2 || Detroit || || Hasek || 20,058 || Canucks lead 2–0 || 
|- align="center"  bgcolor="#bbffbb"
| 3 || April 21 || Detroit || 3 – 1 || Vancouver || || Hasek || 18,422 || Canucks lead 2–1 || 
|- align="center"  bgcolor="#bbffbb"
| 4 || April 23 || Detroit || 4 – 2 || Vancouver || || Hasek || 18,422 || Series tied 2–2 || 
|- align="center"  bgcolor="#bbffbb"
| 5 || April 25 || Vancouver || 0 – 4 || Detroit || || Hasek || 20,058 || Red Wings lead 3–2 || 
|- align="center"  bgcolor="#bbffbb"
| 6 || April 27 || Detroit || 6 – 4 || Vancouver || || Hasek || 18,422 || Red Wings win 4–2 || 
|-

|- align="center"  bgcolor="#bbffbb" 
| 1 || May 2 || St. Louis || 0 – 2 || Detroit || || Hasek || 20,058 || Red Wings lead 1–0 || 
|- align="center"  bgcolor="#bbffbb"
| 2 || May 4 || St. Louis || 2 – 3 || Detroit || || Hasek || 20,058 || Red Wings lead 2–0 || 
|- align="center"  bgcolor="#ffbbbb"
| 3 || May 7 || Detroit || 1 – 6 || St. Louis || || Hasek || 19,107 || Red Wings lead 2–1 || 
|- align="center"  bgcolor="#bbffbb"
| 4 || May 9 || Detroit || 4 – 3 || St. Louis || || Hasek || 19,999 || Red Wings lead 3–1 || 
|- align="center"  bgcolor="#bbffbb"
| 5 || May 11 || St. Louis || 0 – 4 || Detroit || || Hasek || 20,058 || Red Wings win 4–1 || 
|-

|- align="center"  bgcolor="#bbffbb" 
| 1 || May 18 || Colorado || 3 – 5 || Detroit || || Hasek || 20,058 || Red Wings lead 1–0 || 
|- align="center"  bgcolor="#ffbbbb"
| 2 || May 20 || Colorado || 4 – 3 || Detroit || OT || Hasek || 20,058 || Series tied 1–1 || 
|- align="center"  bgcolor="#bbffbb"
| 3 || May 22 || Detroit || 2 – 1 || Colorado || OT || Hasek || 18,007 || Red Wings lead 2–1 || 
|- align="center"  bgcolor="#ffbbbb"
| 4 || May 25 || Detroit || 2 – 3 || Colorado || || Hasek || 18,007 || Series tied 2–2 || 
|- align="center"  bgcolor="#ffbbbb"
| 5 || May 27 || Colorado || 2 – 1 || Detroit || OT || Hasek || 20,058 || Avalanche lead 3–2 || 
|- align="center"  bgcolor="#bbffbb"
| 6 || May 29 || Detroit || 2 – 0 || Colorado || || Hasek || 18,007 || Series tied 3–3 || 
|- align="center"  bgcolor="#bbffbb"
| 7 || May 31 || Colorado || 0 – 7 || Detroit || || Hasek || 20,058 || Red Wings win 4–3 || 
|-

|- align="center"  bgcolor="#ffbbbb" 
| 1 || June 4 || Carolina || 3 – 2 || Detroit || OT || Hasek || 20,058 || Hurricanes lead 1–0 || 
|- align="center"  bgcolor="#bbffbb"
| 2 || June 6 || Carolina || 1 – 3 || Detroit || || Hasek || 20,058 || Series tied 1–1 || 
|- align="center"  bgcolor="#bbffbb"
| 3 || June 8 || Detroit || 3 – 2 || Carolina || 3OT || Hasek || 18,982 || Red Wings lead 2–1 || 
|- align="center"  bgcolor="#bbffbb"
| 4 || June 10 || Detroit || 3 – 0 || Carolina || || Hasek || 18,986 || Red Wings lead 3–1 || 
|- align="center"  bgcolor="#bbffbb"
| 5 || June 13 || Carolina || 1 – 3 || Detroit || || Hasek || 20,058 || Red Wings win 4–1 || 
|-

|-
| Legend:

Player statistics

Scoring
 Position abbreviations: C = Center; D = Defense; G = Goaltender; LW = Left Wing; RW = Right Wing
  = Joined team via a transaction (e.g., trade, waivers, signing) during the season. Stats reflect time with the Red Wings only.
  = Left team via a transaction (e.g., trade, waivers, release) during the season. Stats reflect time with the Red Wings only.

Goaltending

Awards and records

Trophies and awards
Stanley Cup: Detroit Red Wings
Presidents' Trophy: Detroit Red Wings
Clarence S. Campbell Bowl: Detroit Red Wings
James Norris Memorial Trophy: Nicklas Lidstrom
NHL Plus-Minus Award: Chris Chelios
Conn Smythe Trophy: Nicklas Lidstrom

52nd NHL All Star Game
Detroit Red Wings NHL All-Star representatives at the 52nd NHL All-Star Game in Los Angeles, California, at the Staples Center.

 Dominik Hasek, G, (World All Stars), Starter
 Sergei Federov, C, (World All Stars), Starter, Winner of the Hardest Shot event
 Brendan Shanahan, LW, (North American All-Stars), Starter
 Nicklas Lidström, D, (World All Stars), Starter
 Chris Chelios, D, (North American All-Stars)

Transactions
The Red Wings were involved in the following transactions from June 10, 2001, the day after the deciding game of the 2001 Stanley Cup Finals, through June 13, 2002, the day of the deciding game of the 2002 Stanley Cup Finals.

Trades

Players acquired

Players lost

Signings

Draft picks
Detroit's picks at the 2001 NHL Entry Draft in Sunrise, Florida. The Wings had the 29th overall pick, however traded it to Chicago in 1999 during the deal to acquire Chris Chelios.

Farm teams

Cincinnati Mighty Ducks
The Mighty Ducks were Detroit's top affiliate in the American Hockey League (AHL) in 2001–02 and were coached by Mike Babcock (who later became Red Wings coach in 2005).

Toledo Storm
The Storm were the Red Wings' ECHL affiliate for the 2001–02 season. Now known as the Toledo Walleye and still an affiliate to the Red Wings.

See also
2001–02 NHL season

Notes

References

Detroit Red Wings season
Detroit Red Wings seasons
Stanley Cup championship seasons
Presidents' Trophy seasons
Western Conference (NHL) championship seasons
Detroit
Detroit
Detroit Red Wings
Detroit Red Wings